Oliver Dowell John Grace (Mantua, Co. Roscommon, Ireland, 19 October 1791 – Mantua, 25 January 1871) was a landowner in Co. Roscommon  and politician who served at various times as a magistrate, a Grand Juror of Roscommon (1820s and 1830s),  High Sheriff of Roscommon (1831), and as a member of Westminster Parliament for the county (1847-1859).  Grace was elected as a Whig MP in 1847, as an Independent Irish Party MP in 1852, and again as a Whig in 1857.   In 1867, Grace was appointed Vice Lieutenant of Roscommon,  an office he held until his death five years later.  

His deep Irish roots (Grace's family had been established in Ireland for hundreds of years ),  his Roman Catholicism, and the fact that he lived on his estate among his tenants distinguished Grace from many of the landed class of the time, who were often Anglo-Irish or English Protestant “absentees” who resided in Dublin or London.  Although Grace has been described as sharing the attitudes of the landlord class concerning the rights of property,  he frequently identified with the causes of the native Irish when their interests diverged from those of the gentry.  Grace was, by his own description, “an unflinching opponent of any Government that will not  advance and promote [Ireland’s] interests”.   This was evident when, in 1832, he took the extraordinary step of declining to join in the customary address of the clergy, nobility, gentry and landed proprietors to Lord Lorton (the largest landowner in Roscommon) on his appointment as Lord Lieutenant of the county.  Grace instead subscribed to a counter declaration in which he and several other prominent figures in the county denounced the appointment, stating that they “view[ed] with indignation the appointment of a nobleman who has always been the enemy to reform.  That the opinion of the great majority of landed proprietors, as well in number as in property, is decidedly hostile to this appointment and that it is in direct opposition to the middle classes of society in this county, and the entire body of the people.”   

Grace was an outspoken champion of legislation to guarantee “Tenant Right”, which aimed at bettering the condition of tenants “by giving them a legal security in the lands they live in”.  His particular ties to the tenantry on his estate are reflected in his funding of a new National School for Mantua in 1869,  and his willingness to allow his house to serve as a chapel before the building of the local church in 1870.  

While little is known about the experience of Grace's tenants during the famine of 1845 to 1852, when starvation, eviction and emigration ravaged the Irish population, the census figures indicate that the impact on Grace's tenants was less severe than in surrounding areas.  We are left to infer that this was the result of measures he took to alleviate his tenants’ plight. During the ten-year period from 1841 to 1851, which included the first six years of the famine, the population of Grace's estate, which comprised about 3000 acres in 13 townlands in Shankill and Kilcolagh Civil Parishes, declined by 5.5%, but this is to be compared with a 37% fall in the population of the 36 other townlands in the same two civil parishes that were under the management of other landlords.  During the next ten years from 1851 to 1861, which included the last few years of the famine and its immediate aftermath, the population on the Mantua estate rose by 10.2%, while the population in the other townlands fell by a further 6.9%. 

At the time of his death, Grace was described as “not only a kind-hearted and singularly generous landlord (one of the last acts of his honored life was to grant leases to all his tenants, who applied for them) but a most zealous practical supporter of every undertaking intended to promote religion, charity, and education amongst the people.” His funeral cortège included 100 vehicles and 2000 people on foot.

Grace is buried in the family mausoleum at Tulsk Abbey.

Grace was survived by a son, John Dowell Fitzgerald Grace, and a daughter, Mary Clare. The latter married Robert Archbold, MP for Kildare.  After the death of her husband in 1855, she entered the Sisters of Mercy and, in 1868, founded a convent in Elphin, near Mantua.

References

External links
 

1791 births
1871 deaths
Irish Nationalist politicians
Whig (British political party) MPs for Irish constituencies
Members of the Parliament of the United Kingdom for County Roscommon constituencies (1801–1922)
UK MPs 1847–1852
UK MPs 1852–1857
UK MPs 1857–1859